Paratrophon quoyi is a species of sea snail, a marine gastropod mollusc in the family Muricidae, the murex snails or rock snails.

Description

These marine snails are small, being about 14 mm in length.  Their shells are pinkish in color and spiralled.  See  for photos.

Distribution
Paratrophon quoyi are found in waters off New South Wales in Australia and the North Island in New Zealand.
They live on rocks in the intertidal zone.  They feed on algae during high tide. During low tide, they shut themselves up tight to prevent water loss.

References

Muricidae
Australasian realm fauna
Gastropods described in 1846